Lac qui Parle is an unincorporated community in Lac qui Parle Township, Lac qui Parle County, Minnesota, United States.

Notes

Unincorporated communities in Lac qui Parle County, Minnesota
Unincorporated communities in Minnesota